Dică may refer to:

 Nicolae Dică, a Romanian football player, playing for Viitorul Constanța;
 Emil Dică, another Romanian football player playing for CFR Cluj. 

DICA may refer to:
 Directorate of Investment and Company Administration